Silver Dollar is a community in the Kenora District of Ontario, located at the junction of Highway 599 and Highway 642.

Economy

Silver Dollar Inn and Campground is a camping and outfitter store supplying hunters and anglers visiting nearby lakes. The Inn host a campground for trailers and recreational vehicles. The inn's Can-Op is the first service station available for motorist before heading north on Highway 599.

Services

Salt barn on Highway 642 just off Highway 599 services both roadways in winter months.

Communities in Kenora District